Leonard Bernard Stern (December 23, 1922 – June 7, 2011) was an American screenwriter, film and television producer, director, and one of the creators, with Roger Price, of the word game Mad Libs.

Life and career
Stern was born in New York City and studied at New York University. Stern was a successful television writer who wrote for such now classic series such as The Honeymooners, The Phil Silvers Show, The Steve Allen Show, Tonight Starring Steve Allen and Get Smart (a program on which he served as executive producer). Stern created the signature opening door credits for Get Smart.

Stern was also a writer for the 1952 Danny Thomas and Peggy Lee version of The Jazz Singer and a few Abbott and Costello films (with Martin Ragaway), among others. In the 1970s, he produced and directed the TV series McMillan & Wife, which starred Rock Hudson and Susan Saint James.

Stern was the senior vice president of Price Stern Sloan (PSS). In 2000, after Price's death, Stern and another partner, Larry Sloan, launched another publishing company, Tallfellow Press, and acquired the rights to Droodles. Stern co-wrote, with Diane L. Robison, A Martian Wouldn't Say That (2000), a compilation of actual memos and notes from television executives.

Early in his career, when he wanted to write feature films on his own, he had trouble finding work. When he finally got the assignment for Let's Go Navy! he adopted the pseudonym "Max Adams" because he "wasn't particularly proud of doing a Bowery Boys [film]".

Personal life
Stern was married twice. His first marriage was in 1951 to actress Julie Adams. The marriage ended in divorce two years later in 1953. In 1956, Stern married actress Gloria Stroock, to whom he remained married until his death. The couple had two children, Kate and Michael.

Death
On June 7, 2011, Stern died of heart failure at his home in Beverly Hills, California, aged 88. He was survived by his wife of 55 years, actress Gloria Stroock, as well as a son, daughter, two grandchildren, and a great-granddaughter. Funeral services were held at Mount Sinai Memorial Park.

Selected film and television credits
Producer
I'm Dickens, He's Fenster (1962–1963)
Supermarket Sweep (1965)
Get Smart (1965–1968)
Run, Buddy, Run (1966)
The Hero (1966–1967)
He & She (1967–1968)
The Good Guys (1968–1970)
The Governor & J.J. (1969–1970)
McMillan & Wife (1971–1976)
The Snoop Sisters (1972–1974)
Faraday & Company (1973)
Holmes & Yoyo (1976–1977)
Lanigan's Rabbi (1976)
Rosetti and Ryan (1977)
Operation Petticoat (1977–1978)
Partners in Crime (1984)
Get Smart, Again! (1989)
Missing Pieces (film) (1992)

Writer
Africa Screams (1949) uncredited, with Martin Ragaway
Ma and Pa Kettle Go to Town (1950) with Martin Ragaway
Abbott and Costello in the Foreign Legion (1950) with Martin Ragaway
The Milkman (1952) with Martin Ragaway
Ma and Pa Kettle at the Fair (1952) with Martin Ragaway
Lost in Alaska (1952) with Martin Ragaway
The Jazz Singer (1952)
Three for the Show (1955)
The Steve Allen Show (1956–1960)
The Honeymooners (1955–1956)
The Phil Silvers Show (1956)
The Jackie Gleason Show (1953–1956)
The Good Guys (1968)

Director
I'm Dickens, He's Fenster (1962–1963)
Run, Buddy, Run (1966)
He & She (1967)
The Good Guys (1968)
The Governor & J.J. (1969)
McMillan & Wife (1971)
The Snoop Sisters (1972)
Holmes & Yoyo (1976)
Lanigan's Rabbi (1977)
Just You and Me, Kid (1979)
Partners in Crime (1984)
Missing Pieces (1992)

Awards
 Emmy Award, 1957, Best Comedy Writing-variety Or Situation Comedy (The Phil Silvers Show)
 Emmy Award, 1967, Outstanding Writing Achievement In Comedy (Get Smart)

References

External links
 
 Leonard Stern interview at Archive of American Television – July 13, 2000 and August 20, 2008

1922 births
2011 deaths
Writers from New York City
American publishers (people)
American television directors
Television producers from New York City
American television writers
Jewish American screenwriters
American male television writers
Emmy Award winners
Screenwriters from New York (state)
21st-century American Jews